El Cubo de Don Sancho is a large municipality in the province of Salamanca, western Spain, part of the autonomous community of Castile-Leon.

Geography

References

Municipalities in the Province of Salamanca